Vijay Singh (born 1963) is a Fijian professional golfer.

Vijay Singh may also refer to:

Vijay Singh (activist) (born 1962), Indian anti-corruption activist
Vijay Singh (civil servant) (born 1948), Indian civil servant
Vijay Singh (Fijian politician), Fijian politician
Vijay Singh (filmmaker), Indian filmmaker and writer
Vijay Singh (Indian politician) (born 1974), Indian politician in Uttar Pradesh
Vijay Singh of Marwar (1729–1793), ruler of Marwar
Vijay Bahadur Singh (born 1940), Indian politician
Vijay Kumar Singh (born 1951), Indian politician and former army general
Vijay Prakash Singh (born c. 1954), Indian gastroenterologist
Vijay P. Singh (born 1946), American hydrologist
Vijay Pal Singh (born 1967), Indian pole vaulter
Vijay R. Singh (1931–2006), Indo-Fijian lawyer and politician

See also
Singh